dvd+rw-tools (also known as growisofs, its main part) is a collection of open-source DVD and Blu-ray Disc tools for Linux, OpenBSD, NetBSD, FreeBSD, Solaris, HP-UX, IRIX, Windows and OS X. dvd+rw-tools does not operate CD media.

The package itself requires another program which is used to create ISO 9660 images on the fly. This is provided by mkisofs (from the cdrtools package) or genisoimage (from the cdrkit package) or a symbolic link xorrisofs to xorriso (from the libisoburn or GNU xorriso package).

Released under the GNU General Public License, dvd+rw-tools is free software.

Programs 
 growisofs burns data to DVD or BD media.
 dvd+rw-mediainfo reports about drive and medium status.
 dvd+rw-format formats some types of media, blanks DVD-RW media.
 dvd-ram-control controls Defect Management and write protection of DVD-RAM media.
 dvd+rw-booktype sets the Book Type property of DVD media.

growisofs 
growisofs is a SCSI/MMC driver in userspace for burning optical media, like cdrecord or libburn. Its original purpose is to coordinate burning with a run of mkisofs, so that ISO 9660 multi-session becomes possible on DVD+RW media. But soon it supported all kinds of DVD media and later also BD (Blu-ray) media. Further it can burn preformatted data images onto the media, not needing any ISO 9660 formatter program for this task.

growisofs employs a Ring Buffer in userspace to smoothen the data transmission to the drive. The fill level of this buffer is reported during a burn run as "RBU", whereas the fill level of the drive's built-in buffer is reported as "UBU".

References

External links 
 

Free optical disc authoring software
Optical disc authoring software